Iskra Dimitrova (born 1965) is a multimedia artist in the Republic of Macedonia.

She was born in Skopje and received a BA in Philosophy and a BFA in sculpture from Ss. Cyril and Methodius University of Skopje.

She has presented her work at solo exhibitions and installations in Skopje, Vrsac in Yugoslavia, Zagreb in Croatia, Rochdale in England, Tokyo, Yokohama and Madison, South Dakota. Her work has been included in the Venice Biennial (1999) and at international exhibitions in Maribor, Selestat, Thessalonica, Larisa and Providence, Rhode Island.

References 

1965 births
Living people
Multimedia artists
Women multimedia artists
Macedonian women artists
Macedonian contemporary artists